Swing Time is a compilation album by American country band Asleep at the Wheel. Released on February 5, 1992 by Sony Music Special Products, it contains select tracks from the group's three albums on Epic Records: 1974's Asleep at the Wheel, 1987's 10 and 1988's Western Standard Time.

Reception

Hank Small of music website AllMusic awarded Swing Time three out of five stars and described the album as "a fine introduction to Asleep at the Wheel's retro sound".

Track listing

References

External links

Asleep at the Wheel albums
1992 compilation albums
Sony Music Special Products compilation albums